Hercules and Omphale is an oil-on-canvas painting by François Boucher, painted in 1732–1734 and now in the Pushkin Museum in Moscow. It was in the Yusupov collection in Saint Petersburg until 1930. It dates to the period just after Boucher completed his studies with François Lemoyne.

References

1730s paintings
Paintings in the collection of the Pushkin Museum
Mythological paintings by François Boucher
Paintings depicting Heracles